was established on April 5, 1986, as the adult video (AV) label for Japan Home Video (JHV).

Company information
The early AVs produced by JHV went under the Penguin (ぺんぎん) label, the first title being the 30-minute-long softcore Asobinasareya, Tadakurue (遊びなされや、ただ狂へ) starring Hidemi Nakajima (中島秀美) released May 21, 1984, with production code KA-1001. The same production code series was used for releases under the Alice Japan label which began with Sexy Violence (セクシーバイオレンス), KA-1050, starring Mariko Kajikawa. In the years following, the company continued using the "KA" series for their products released on VHS tape.

Iconic AV Idol Hitomi Kobayashi was one of the company's first stars appearing in Alice Japan videos as early as 1986. Among other early AV actresses who made their debut with Alice Japan were Riria Yoshikawa in 1990 and Asami Jō in 1995. Early directors for the company include Rokurō Mochizuki, who started in pink film, Kunihiro Hasegawa and Yuji Sakamoto, who were directing for Alice Japan in the late 1980s and early 1990s.

Alice Japan has had a long association dating back to at least 1997 with the Kuki Inc. group of AV companies which includes Kuki, Max-A, Atlas21, Big Morkal, Media Station (Cosmos Plan) and Sexia. Like several of the other companies in this group, Alice Japan works mostly with new actresses especially those making their debut in AV. All these companies use the Kuki-owned X CITY website to advertise and distribute streaming video versions of their products.

Like Kuki, h.m.p., Max-A and many of the older "pro" AV studios in Japan, Alice Japan has been a member of the ethics group Nihon Ethics of Video Association (NEVA) which regulates content and the censorship mosaic required in Japanese porn videos. Because of this, most of the videos produced by Alice Japan have used a large, blocky analog mosaic as opposed to the newer thinner digital mosaics now in common use among the "indie" studios such as the Soft On Demand (SOD) group. In 2007, the company began re-releasing several of its old videos using a new thinner mosaic standard under the "Alice Pink" label.

The Alice Japan Official Website contains a large searchable database of Alice Japan videos dating back to 1984 as well as a list of actresses and a section for Actress Blogs.

Labels
In addition to the standard Alice Japan label, the following have also been used for adult videos:

Directors
AV directors who have worked frequently for Alice Japan include:

 Some Chan
 Kazutoshi Goto (後藤和俊)
 Minami Haou  (南★波王)
 Kunihiro Hasegawa
 Takumi Iwasaki (岩崎たくみ)
 Shigeo Katsuyama (勝山茂雄)
 Kazuhito Kuramoto (倉本和比人)
 Rokurō Mochizuki
 Kei Morikawa
 Kyosuke Murayama (村山恭助)
 Tadanori Usami
 Pusuke Yamada (山田風゜助)

Actresses
Some of the most famous AV Idols in Japanese porn have performed for Alice Japan including:

 Kyōko Aizome
 Hotaru Akane
 Riko Akina
 Minori Aoi
 Sora Aoi
 Tsukasa Aoi
 Yuma Asami
 Ami Ayukawa
 Mari Ayukawa
 Yumika Hayashi
 Ai Iijima
 Ayame Ikehata
 Asami Jō
 Bunko Kanazawa
 Mariko Kawana
 Kyōko Kazama
 Aino Kishi
 Hitomi Kobayashi
 Yuri Komuro
 Hitomi Kudo
 Hiromi Matsuura
 Mihiro
 Ryōko Mitake
 Aika Miura
 Alice Miyuki
 Rena Murakami
 Nana Nanaumi 
 Mako Oda
 Anna Ohura
 Nao Oikawa
 Natsuki Ozawa
 Nao Saejima
 Rui Sakuragi
 Ai Sayama
 Kaho Shibuya
 Riko Tachibana
 Yui Tatsumi
 Maki Tomoda
 Aki Tomosaki
 Rico Yamaguchi
 Akiho Yoshizawa
 Makoto Yuki
 Maria Yumeno

Series
A selected list of series from the Alice Japan label:
 Dangerous Looked-Up Room (危ない密室)
 Flash Paradise (フラッシュパラダイス)
 Flashback (フラッシュバック)
 Give Up Human Being AKA Inhumanity (人間廃業)
 Mejiri AKA Female Ass (女尻)
 Obscene Model (猥褻モデル)
 The Contrary Soap Heaven / Reverse Soap Heaven (逆ソープ天国)

References

External links
 
 

Japanese pornographic film studios
Mass media companies established in 1986
Mass media companies based in Tokyo
Nakano, Tokyo
Japanese companies established in 1986